Subhadra Kumari Chauhan (16 August 1904 – 15 February 1948) was an Indian poet. One of her most popular poems is "Jhansi ki Rani" (about the courageous Queen of Jhansi).Biography
Subhadra Chauhan was born in Nihalpur village in Prayagraj District, Uttar Pradesh. She initially studied in the Crosthwaite Girls' School in Allahabad where she was senior to and friends with Mahadevi Verma and passed the middle-school examination in 1919. She married Thakur Lakshman Singh Chauhan of Khandwa in 1919 when she was sixteen with whom she had five children. After her marriage with Thakur Lakshman Singh Chauhan of Khandwa in the same year, she moved to Jubbulpore (now Jabalpur), Central Provinces.

In 1921, Subhadra Kumari Chauhan and her husband joined Mahatma Gandhi's Non-Cooperation Movement. She was the first woman Satyagrahi to court arrest in Nagpur and was jailed twice for her involvement in protests against the British rule in 1923 and 1942.

She was a member of the legislative assembly of the state (erstwhile Central Provinces). She died in 1948 in a car accident near Seoni, Madhya Pradesh, on her way back to Jabalpur from Nagpur, the then capital of Central Provinces, where she had gone to attend the assembly session.

Writing career
Chauhan authored a number of popular works in Hindi poetry. Her most famous composition is Jhansi Ki Rani, an emotionally charged poem describing the life of Rani Lakshmi Bai. The poem is one of the most recited and sung poems in Hindi literature. An emotionally charged description of the life of the queen of Jhansi(British India) and her participation in the 1857 revolution, it is often taught in schools in India. A couplet repeated at the end of each stanza reads thus:

This and her other poems, Jallianwala Bagh mein Vasant, Veeron Ka Kaisa Ho Basant, Rakhi Ki Chunauti, and  Vida, openly talk about the freedom movement. They are said to have inspired great numbers of Indian youth to participate in the Indian Freedom Movement. Here is the opening stanza of Jhansi ki Rani:

Subhadra Kumari Chauhan wrote in the Khariboli dialect of Hindi, in a simple, clear style. Apart from heroic poems, she also wrote poems for children. She wrote some short stories based on the life of the middle class.

Legacy
The ICGS Subhadra Kumari Chauhan, an Indian Coast Guard ship, was named for the poet. The government of Madhya Pradesh placed a statue of Subhadra Kumari Chauhan before the Municipal Corporation office of Jabalpur. 

On 6 August 1976, India Posts released a postage stamp to commemorate her.

On 16 August 2021, Google commemorated Subhadra Kumari with a Doodle on her 117th birth anniversary. Google commented: "Chauhan’s poetry remains a staple in many Indian classrooms as a symbol of historical progress, encouraging future generations to stand up against social injustice and celebrate the words that shaped a nation’s history".

Works

Collections of poems
 Khilonewala
 Tridhara Mukul (1930)
 Yeh Kadamb Ka Ped
These anthologies consist some of the well-known poems like "Jhansi ki Raani", "Veeron Ka Kaisa Ho Basant" and "Yeh Kadamb Ka Ped".

 "Seedhe-Saade Chitra" (1946)
 "Mera naya Bachpan" (1946)
 "Bikhare Moti" (1932)
 "Jhansi ki Rani"

 Short stories 

 Hingvala (or Hingwala)

References

Further reading
 

External links

 
 Short note and recitation of the poem Jhansi Ki Rani
 Jhansi Ki Rani English Translation By Qazi Muhammad Ahkam
 Subhadra Kumari Chauhan at Bharat Darshan''

1904 births
1948 deaths
Hindi-language poets
Poets from Uttar Pradesh
People from Allahabad district
Indian women poets
People from Khandwa
People from Jabalpur
Indian independence activists from Uttar Pradesh
Prisoners and detainees of British India
20th-century Indian women writers
20th-century Indian poets
Women writers from Uttar Pradesh